Clear Creek is a  long 3rd order tributary to the Rocky River in Cabarrus County, North Carolina.

Variant names
According to the Geographic Names Information System, it has also been known historically as:
Cleur Creek
Red Creek

Course
Clear Creek rises in Mint Hill in Mecklenburg County, North Carolina.  Clear Creek then flows northeast into Cabarrus County and then turns southeast into Union County to meet the Rocky River about 1 mile east-northeast of Brief at the Cabarrus-Union County line.

Watershed
Clear Creek drains  of area, receives about 47.4 in/year of precipitation, has a topographic wetness index of 415.19 and is about 49% forested.

References

Rivers of North Carolina
Rivers of Cabarrus County, North Carolina
Rivers of Mecklenburg County, North Carolina
Rivers of Union County, North Carolina
Tributaries of the Pee Dee River